The Home District was one of four districts of the Province of Quebec created in 1788 in the western reaches of the Montreal District and detached in 1791 to create the new colony of Upper Canada. It was abolished with the adoption of the county system in 1849.

Territorial evolution
Originally established as Nassau District in 1788, it was renamed as the "Home District" in 1792, The district was originally bounded to the east by a line running north–south from the mouth of the Trent River and to the west by a line running north–south 'intersecting the extreme projection of Long Point into the lake Erie." The northern boundaries were vague and overlapping Indian land. The district town was originally Newark, later Niagara-on-the-Lake.

In 1798, the Niagara District was created from Lincoln County and Haldimand County, and the London District was formed from the counties of Middlesex, Norfolk and Oxford, both of which were detached from the Home District. The remainder was organized as follows:

Reductions and abolition
The District was reduced in size in several steps over the coming years.

The 1798 Act had provided that counties of Durham and Northumberland, upon a request by a majority of their townships, could be detached to form the Newcastle District. This occurred in 1802.

In 1816, the following parts of the District were detached to form Halton County in the newly created Gore District:

In 1837, Simcoe District was detached, consisting of Simcoe County.

In 1849, the Home District was dissolved and replaced for municipal purposes by York County, which was reorganized later that year to form the United Counties of York, Ontario and Peel.

Further reading
 First published as

References

Districts of Upper Canada
1788 establishments in the Province of Quebec (1763–1791)
1849 disestablishments in Canada